The 1967–68 St. Louis Blues season was the inaugural season in the history of the franchise. The Blues were one of the six new teams added to the NHL in the 1967 expansion. The other franchises were the Minnesota North Stars, Los Angeles Kings, Philadelphia Flyers, Pittsburgh Penguins, and California Seals. The league doubled in size from its Original Six.

St. Louis was the last of the expansion teams to officially get into the league. The Blues were chosen over Baltimore at the insistence of the Chicago Black Hawks.  The Black Hawks were owned at that time by the Wirtz family, who also owned the St. Louis Arena. The team's first owners were insurance tycoon Sid Salomon Jr., his son, Sid Salomon III, and Robert L. Wolfson. Sid Salomon III convinced his initially wary father to make a bid for the team. Salomon then spent several million dollars on renovations for the 38-year-old Arena, which increased the number of seats from 12,000 to 15,000 and provided its first significant maintenance since the 1940s.

Because the playoff format required an expansion team to make it to the Stanley Cup finals, the Blues became the first expansion team to reach that mark. However, they were the last of the still operating 1967 expansion teams to win the cup, which they did in 2019.

Offseason

NHL draft
The Blues attempted to select Saskatoon Blades forward Dale Fairbrother with their first round pick, but the pick was ruled invalid since Fairbrother was on the Portland Buckaroos' sponsored list. The Blues passed on making selections in the second and third rounds.

Regular season

The franchise's first game was played on October 11, 1967. The Blues and Minnesota North Stars played to a 2–2 tie at the St. Louis Arena, with the Blues' first ever team goal scored by Larry Keenan of North Bay, Ontario. A St. Michaels product, Keenan had his career end prematurely due to injuries. He relocated back to North Bay where he coached a local Midget AAA team for many years.

The Blues were originally coached by Lynn Patrick who resigned in late-November and was replaced by Scotty Bowman. Although the league's rules effectively kept star players with the Original Six teams, the Blues were one of the stronger teams of the Western Division.  The playoff format required an expansion team to make it to the Stanley Cup finals, and the Blues made it to the final round.

Season standings

Record vs. opponents

Schedule and results

Expansion draft
 St. Louis Blues selections

Player statistics

Forwards
Note: GP= Games played; G= Goals; AST= Assists; PTS = Points; PIM = Points

Defensemen
Note: GP= Games played; G= Goals; AST= Assists; PTS = Points; PIM = Points

Goaltending
Note: GP= Games played; MIN= Minutes; W= Wins; L= Losses; T = Ties; SO = Shutouts; GAA = Goals against

Post-season stats

Forwards
Note: GP= Games played; G= Goals; AST= Assists; PTS = Points; PIM = Points

Defensemen
Note: GP= Games played; G= Goals; AST= Assists; PTS = Points; PIM = Points

Goaltending
Note: GP= Games played; MIN= Minutes; W= Wins; L= Losses; T = Ties; SO = Shutouts; GAA = Goals against

Playoffs

|- align=center bgcolor="#bbffbb"
| 1 || April 4 || St. Louis || 1–0 || Philadelphia ||  || Hall || 10,649 || Blues lead 1–0
|- align="center" bgcolor="#ffbbbb"
| 2 || April 6 || St. Louis || 3–4 || Philadelphia ||  || Hall || 11,111  || Series tied 1–1
|- align="center" bgcolor="#bbffbb"
| 3 || April 10 || Philadelphia || 2–3 || St. Louis || OT || Hall || 10,867 || Blues lead 2–1
|- align="center" bgcolor="#bbffbb"
| 4 || April 11 || Philadelphia || 2–5 || St. Louis ||  || Hall || 11,070 || Blues lead 3–1
|- align="center" bgcolor="#ffbbbb"
| 5 || April 13 || St. Louis || 1–6 || Philadelphia || || Hall || 10,587 || Blues lead 3–2
|- align="center" bgcolor="#ffbbbb"
| 6 || April 16 || Philadelphia || 2–1 || St. Louis || OT || Hall || 13,738 || Series tied 3–3
|- align="center" bgcolor="#bbffbb"
| 7 || April 18 || St. Louis || 3–1 || Philadelphia || || Hall || 14,646 || Blues win 4–3
|-

Stanley Cup Finals
The Blues beat the North Stars in a game 7 double overtime and made the Stanley Cup finals. Although they lost in four straight games, they played proudly, as all four games each were decided by just one goal (and two of the four were decided in overtime). Glenn Hall was especially noted for his goaltending, especially in game three when the Blues were outshot 46 to 15. Red Burnett, one of the most prominent hockey writers of the day, said of Hall's playing, "A number of Hall's saves were seemingly impossible. Experts walked out of the Forum convinced no other goaltender had performed so brilliantly in a losing cause." In overtime in game three, Hall made an exceptional save on Dick Duff and then, standing on his head, made another. Burnett said, "It was a heartbreaker to see. After the saves on Duff, Bobby Rousseau came and batted home the second rebound." Hall's playing won him the Conn Smythe Trophy as the most valuable player in the playoffs.

However, Montreal was not to be denied and won the Stanley Cup in game four as J. C. Tremblay fired home the winning goal. When the game ended, the fans came on the ice to celebrate, and balloons, hats and programs were thrown from the stands.

Montreal wins the series 4–0.

Awards and honors
 Glenn Hall, Conn Smythe Trophy

References

External links
 Blues on Hockey Database
 

 

St. Louis Blues seasons
St. Louis
St. Louis
St
St Louis
St Louis